Iolaus poecilaon, the intense sapphire, is a butterfly in the family Lycaenidae. It is found in Nigeria, Cameroon, the Republic of the Congo, the Democratic Republic of the Congo, Uganda, Tanzania and Zambia. The habitat consists of forests.

The larvae feed on Phragmanthera rufescens, Phragmanthera usuiensis usuiensis, Phragmanthera polycrypta and Phragmanthera brieyi. The head of the larvae closely resemble new buds of their host plant. They feed on these buds and position themselves so that their heads takes their place as a form of camouflage.

Subspecies
Iolaus poecilaon poecilaon (Nigeria: the Cross River loop, Cameroon, Congo, Uganda, north-western Tanzania, Democratic Republic of Congo: Uele, Kinshasa and Lualaba)
Iolaus poecilaon fisheri Heath, 1983 (north-western Zambia)

References

Butterflies described in 1928
Iolaus (butterfly)